Yo-Kai Watch: Forever Friends is a 2018 supernatural anime film produced by OLM, Inc. and distributed by Toho. It is the fifth film in the Yo-kai Watch film series, following the 2017 film Yo-kai Watch Shadowside: Oni-ō no Fukkatsu, and is the second film set in the 1960s before the series' storyline, featuring a boy named Shin who adventures into the Yo-kai World with his Yo-kai friend Nekomata. It was directed by Shigeru Takahashi, and was released on Japanese theaters on December 14, 2018 alongside the first Dragon Ball Super movie, Dragon Ball Super: Broly, and the Japanese dub of The Grinch.

Plot
"Sakura Motomachi, Tokyo in the 1960s. Shin, a boy who lived happily, despite being poor, loses his mother, his only family member, and falls into deep misfortune. Itsuki, a boy who saves Shin, also lost his older sister. Those two boys are joined by Tae, a girl who can see Yo-kai, and together with Shin's guardian spirit Sū-san, and new Yo-kai such as Nekomata, they take on a mysterious incident in order to retrieve the souls of their precious family! And what is the shocking truth that awaits them...!? This is a story about the friendship formed between three children and Yo-kai―"

The film also tells the origin of how Lord Enma became the ruler of the Yo-kai.

Characters

Despite his poverty, he lived happily until his mother died, after which he fell into great despair. He then met his fellow Yo-kai friends and was joined by two children named Itsuki and Tae, with the three planning to return the souls of the citizens of Japan from the soul-devouring fox Yo-kai Tamamo no Mae.
Like Shin, his older sister was gone due to her soul being devoured by Tamamo no Mae.
She is one of the Three Children who adventures in the Yo-kai World during the events of the film.
He's one of the candidates for becoming the next great ruler of the Yo-Kai World and is the main antagonist of the movie.
As was first teased in Corocoro, Enma has three new forms that were introduced in the movie: Yasha Enma, Yasha Enma Rasetsu, & Yasha Enma Benibana.
Like Nekomata, he has a Godside form based on a Tengu.

Release
The film released on December 14, 2018 and opened at #4 at the Japanese box office. Early pre-orders of the movie tickets allowed viewers to obtain a Yo-kai Ark of Nekomata's Lightside form. This ark can be scanned through the Nintendo Switch to obtain Nekomata in Yo-kai Watch 4.

References

External links
  

Yo-kai Watch films
2018 anime films
Adventure anime and manga
Animated adventure films
Supernatural anime and manga
Japanese fantasy adventure films
Japanese animated fantasy films
Toho animated films
2010s fantasy adventure films
Anime films based on video games
OLM, Inc. animated films